WCWC (1430 AM) is a radio station licensed to Williamsburg, Kentucky, United States.  The station is currently owned by Whitley County Board of Education.

References

External links

CWC